Dracocephalum ruyschiana is a species of Dracocephalum.

It is native to Eurasia.

Synonyms
 Dracocephalum alpinum Salisb.
 Dracocephalum angustifolium Gilib.
 Dracocephalum hyssopifolium Mart. ex Steud.
 Dracocephalum spicatum (Mill.) Dulac
 Ruyschiana fasciculata Clairv.
 Ruyschiana ruyschiana (L.) House
 Ruyschiana spicata Mill.
 Zornia linearifolia Moench

References

External links

ruyschiana
Flora of Europe
Flora of Asia